Nontsizi Mgqwetho (fl. 1920s) was a South African poet, "the first and only major female poet to write in Xhosa". Her poems were published in Umteteli wa Bantu, a multilingual weekly Johannesburg newspaper established in 1920.

Works
 (ed. and transl. Jeff Opland) The Nation’s Bounty - The Xhosa Poetry of Nontsizi Mgqwetho,  Wits University Press, 2007

References

Further reading
 Duncan Brown, (2004) 'My Pen is the Tongue of a Skilful Poet: African-Christian identity and the poetry of Nontsizi Mgwetho', English in Africa 31.1 , pp. 23–58
 Athambile Masola, (2018) 'The Politics of the 1920s Black Press: Charlotte Maxeke's and Nontsizi Mgqwetho's Critique of Congress. International Journal of African Renaissance Studies - Multi-, Inter- and Transdisciplinarity, 13:2  pp 59-76, DOI: 10.1080/18186874.2018.1522933 .
 Thulani Nxasana  (2016). “Nontsizi Mgqwetho’s The Nation’s Bounty: A Prophetic Voice towards an African Literary Theory.’’ PhD diss., Rhodes University http://hdl.handle.net/10962/4547 
 Athambile Masola. (2016) Asinakuthula umhlab’ubolile: the poetry of Nontsizi Mgqwetho    https://thoughtleader.co.za/asinakuthula-umhlabubolile-the-poetry-of-nontsizi-mgqwetho/ 
 Isabel Hofmeyr and Ntantala-Jordan, Phyllis (2007) Nation's Bounty: The Xhosa Poetry of Nontsizi Mgqwetho. NYU Press .  
 Jeff Opland (2008). "OF XHOSA LITERATURE: THE CASE OF NONTSIZI MGQWETHO." Beyond the Language Issue: The Production, Mediation and Reception of Creative Writing in African Languages: Selected Papers from the 8th International Janheinz Jahn Sumposium, Mainz 2004 19 (2008): 119.  
 P Bikitisha, (2018) 'The poet who rouses the court and censures the king': An examination of the political praxis of Nontsizi Mgqwetho.  In partial fulfilment of a BA Honours in Historical Studies. University of Cape Town.

External links
 The poetry of Nontsizi Mgqwetho

Year of birth unknown
Year of death unknown
South African women poets
20th-century South African poets
Xhosa people
Xhosa culture
20th-century women writers